Piseinotecus soussi is a species of sea slug, an aeolid nudibranch, a marine gastropod mollusc in the family Piseinotecidae.

Distribution
This nudibranch was described from Cap Ghir, Agadir, Morocco. It is also found in Italy and on the Spanish coast and in France at Banyuls-sur-Mer.

Description
This piseinotecid nudibranch is translucent white in colour, with a pink-purple hue throughout the body. The tips of the rhinophores, oral tentacles and tail are tipped with white. The digestive gland in the cerata is usually red and there is purple surface iridescence on the outer part of the cerata. Each ceras has several white spots around the tip, just below the cnidosac.

Ecology
Piseinotecus soussi feeds on hydroids. It is found in rock pools and in shallow water.

References

 Ortea J. & Moro L. (2020). Tres aeolidáceos con ceratas rojos (aeolirrojos) de la islas de Cabo Verde (Mollusca: Nudibranchia). Avicennia. 26: 35-40.

Piseinotecidae
Gastropods described in 2014